For computer graphics, CMOS sensor processing is done in pixel level.

This process includes two general categories: intrapixel processing, where the processing is performed on the individual pixel signals, and interpixel processing, where the processing is performed locally or globally on signals from several pixels. The purpose of interpixel processing is to perform early vision processing, not merely to capture images.

See also

References

Computer graphics